Norway was represented by Ellen Nikolaysen, with the song "Touch My Life (with Summer)", at the 1975 Eurovision Song Contest, which took place on 22 March in Stockholm. "Touch My Life (with Summer)" was chosen as the Norwegian entry at the Melodi Grand Prix on 25 January. Nikolaysen had previously sung for Norway as a member of the Bendik Singers in 1973 and had also provided backing vocals for Anne-Karine Strøm in 1974.

Before Eurovision

Melodi Grand Prix 1975 
The Melodi Grand Prix 1975 was held at the studios of broadcaster NRK in Oslo, hosted by Bergljot Engeset. Five songs were presented in the final with each song sung twice by different singers, once with a small combo and once with a full orchestra. The winning song was chosen by voting from a 10-member "expert" jury. "Touch My Life (with Summer)" was performed in Norwegian at MGP and was translated into English before going to Stockholm.

At Eurovision 
During the preparation of the contest, the song "Det skulle ha vært sommer nå" was translated as "Touch My Life (with Summer)".

On the night of the final Nikolaysen performed 6th in the running order, following Luxembourg and preceding Switzerland. At the close of voting, Norway picked up only 11 points, placing Norway 18th of the 19 entries, ahead only of Turkey.

Voting

References

External links 
Full national final on nrk.no

1975
Countries in the Eurovision Song Contest 1975
1975
Eurovision
Eurovision